The David S. Brown Store at 8 Thomas Street between Broadway and Church Street in the TriBeCa neighborhood of Manhattan, New York City was built in 1875-76 for a soap manufacturer. It was designed by J. Morgan Slade in the Victorian Gothic style, as influenced by John Ruskin and French architectural theory. The building has been called "An elaborate confection of Romanesque, Venetian Gothic, brick, sandstone, granite, and cast-iron parts..."

The building was designated a New York City landmark in 1978, and was added to the National Register of Historic Places in 1980.

See also
National Register of Historic Places listings in Manhattan below 14th Street
List of New York City Designated Landmarks in Manhattan below 14th Street

References
Notes

External links

Commercial buildings completed in 1875
Commercial buildings on the National Register of Historic Places in Manhattan
Gothic Revival architecture in New York (state)
New York City Designated Landmarks in Manhattan
Tribeca
Venetian Gothic architecture in the United States